Heteroderes is a genus of beetles belonging to the family Elateridae.

The genus has cosmopolitan distribution.

Species:
 Heteroderes albicans Candeze, 1878

References

Elateridae
Elateridae genera